Hillel Slovak (April 13, 1962 – June 25, 1988)  was an Israeli-American musician best known as the founding guitarist of the Los Angeles rock band Red Hot Chili Peppers, with whom he recorded two albums. His guitar work was rooted in funk and hard rock, and he often experimented with other genres, including reggae and speed metal. He is considered to have been a major influence on the Red Hot Chili Peppers' early sound.

Born in Israel, he later moved to the United States. Slovak met future bandmates Anthony Kiedis, Flea, and Jack Irons while attending Fairfax High School in Los Angeles. There, he formed the group What Is This? with Irons, Alain Johannes, and Todd Strassman; Flea later replaced Strassman.

Slovak, Flea, Kiedis, and Irons founded Red Hot Chili Peppers in 1983, gaining popularity in Los Angeles through their energetic stage presence and spirited performances. Slovak eventually quit to focus on What is This?, which had been signed to a record deal, leaving the Red Hot Chili Peppers to record their 1984 debut album without him, including five songs he co-wrote. Slovak rejoined the Chili Peppers in 1985 and recorded the albums Freaky Styley (1985) and The Uplift Mofo Party Plan (1987) with them.

During his career, Slovak developed a serious heroin addiction. He attempted to quit many times but died of an overdose on June 25, 1988, at age 26. Several Red Hot Chili Peppers songs have been written as tributes to Slovak, including "Knock Me Down", "My Lovely Man", and "Feasting on the Flowers". In 1999, his brother James published a book, Behind the Sun: The Diary and Art of Hillel Slovak, which features Slovak's diaries and paintings. Slovak was posthumously inducted into the Rock and Roll Hall of Fame as a member of the Red Hot Chili Peppers on April 14, 2012, with his brother accepting the award on his behalf.

Life and career

1962–80: Early life and Anthym
Hillel Slovak was born in Haifa, Israel, to Jewish parents who were survivors of the Holocaust. His mother was originally from Poland while his father grew up in Yugoslavia. They settled in the Queens borough of New York City, then in 1967 relocated to Southern California. As a child, Slovak developed an interest in art, and often spent time painting with his mother, Esther. He attended Laurel Elementary School in West Hollywood and Bancroft Jr. High School in Hollywood, where he met future bandmates Jack Irons and Michael "Flea" Balzary. Slovak received his first guitar at age 13 as a bar mitzvah present, and regularly played the instrument into the late hours of the night.  During this time, he was highly influenced by hard rock music such as Jimi Hendrix, Led Zeppelin, and Kiss.

As a freshman at Fairfax High School, Slovak formed a band with Irons on drums and two other high school friends, Alain Johannes and Todd Strassman. They called their band Chain Reaction, then changed the name to Anthem after their first gig.  After one of the group's shows, Slovak met audience member Anthony Kiedis, and invited him to his house for a snack.  Kiedis later described the experience in his autobiography Scar Tissue: "Within a few minutes of hanging out with Hillel, I sensed that he was absolutely different from most of the people I'd spent time with ... He understood a lot about music, he was a great visual artist, and he had a sense of self and a calm about him that were just riveting." Slovak, Kiedis and Flea became best friends and often used LSD, heroin, cocaine and methamphetamine recreationally.

The original bassist for Anthem, which renamed to Anthym, was deemed unsatisfactory, so Slovak began teaching Flea to play bass. Following several months of commitment to the instrument, Flea developed proficiency and a strong musical chemistry with Slovak. When Strassman saw Flea playing Anthym songs on his equipment he quit the band, with Flea quickly replacing him. Shortly afterwards Anthym entered a local Battle of the Bands contest and won second place. Anthym started to play at local nightclubs, despite the fact that the members were all underage. After graduating from high school, the band changed their name to What Is This?. Flea left Anthym around this time to accept an offer of playing bass in the prominent L.A. punk band Fear. What Is This? continued on and performed many shows along the California coast.

1980–82: Red Hot Chili Peppers formation

Slovak, Kiedis, and Flea began to create their own music after finding inspiration in a punk-funk fusion band called Defunkt. The three formed a band with former Anthym-drummer Jack Irons called Tony Flow and the Miraculously Majestic Masters of Mayhem. The band had only one song, entitled "Out in L.A.", and was formed for the purpose of playing the song once.  The song was based on a guitar riff that Slovak wrote while "jamming" with Irons, and was not meant to become a real song until Kiedis decided to rap over the music. Following the group's first show at The Rhythm Lounge, the owner of the bar asked them to return, but with two songs instead of one. After several more shows, and the addition of several songs to their repertoire, the band's name was changed to Red Hot Chili Peppers.

After the band started to gain popularity amongst the L.A. club scene, Kiedis began writing more lyrics. The lyrics would eventually become songs such as "Green Heaven" and "True Men Don't Kill Coyotes", and the band's concert repertoire quickly grew to nine songs as a result of months of playing local nightclubs and bars.  Over the course of the next six months, the Red Hot Chili Peppers played many shows in L.A. clubs and became something of an underground hit. Slovak, Kiedis, and Flea moved into a small house in a high-crime area in Hollywood where they collaborated musically and continued their drug addictions.  The threesome traveled to New York City to perform more shows and to "spread Chili Pepperdom".  Shortly after the trip, Slovak moved out of the group's shared house to live with his girlfriend.

1982–88: What is This? stint, Freaky Styley, and The Uplift Mofo Party Plan
The Red Hot Chili Peppers entered Bijou Studios to record a demo tape and subsequently secured a record deal with EMI. Flea left Fear to pursue the Red Hot Chili Peppers. At the same time, What is This? had also gotten a record deal. Since Slovak considered the Chili Peppers to merely be a side project and not a serious commitment, he left them to concentrate on What is This?. Flea ultimately respected the decision, but felt the band would suffer musically without him and Irons. He and Kiedis hired drummer Cliff Martinez and guitarist Jack Sherman to fill Irons' and Slovak's places, respectively.  During the recording of the second What is This? album, Slovak became frustrated with the band and contacted Flea about rejoining the Red Hot Chili Peppers. This came at an opportune time, as the group was dissatisfied with Slovak's replacement, Jack Sherman. Kiedis felt that Sherman's guitar work "didn't have the same spirit" that Slovak contributed to the band's sound.  When Flea asked Kiedis how he felt about Slovak rejoining the band, Kiedis responded by saying, "I'd give my firstborn son to get him back in the band." After the culmination of the promotional tour for their first album, Sherman was fired and Slovak rejoined the band.

Slovak returned to the Chili Peppers for their second album, Freaky Styley, which was released on August 16, 1985. What is This? had finally disbanded, and Irons returned to the Chili Peppers in mid 1986 after Martinez was fired. Flea, Slovak and Kiedis especially were involved in heavy drug use and their relationships became strained. Flea recalled that "it began to seem ugly to me and not fun; our communication was not healthy". Kiedis became dependent on heroin, leaving the rest of the group to work on much of the album's material by themselves. The band lived in Detroit for a portion of the recording of the album, where Kiedis and Slovak indulged in heavy cocaine use.  When Slovak was under the influence, he would often wear brightly colored clothing and dance in a "shuffling" fashion, which became the inspiration for the song "Skinny Sweaty Man" from the band's next album.  After Kiedis completed a stint in rehab, he rejoined the Red Hot Chili Peppers in Los Angeles to record their third album The Uplift Mofo Party Plan. Slovak felt a deep connection to the album; he reflected in his diary "It was so fun. I'm so extremely proud of everybody's work—it is at times genius." Slovak was the subject of the songs "Skinny Sweaty Man", "Me and My Friends", & "No Chump Love Sucker". He was nicknamed "Slim Bob Billy", "Slim", or "Huckleberry", and throughout the albums Kiedis calls him by these nicknames before he starts a guitar solo.  On The Uplift Mofo Party Plan, Slovak experimented with different musical styles, playing the sitar on the song "Behind the Sun".

Health decline
Slovak and Kiedis became addicted to heroin early in their careers, and Slovak often attempted to conceal his addiction from his friends and family.  The band was generally more worried about Kiedis' addiction, which was much more open and noticeable to the other members, while Slovak according to Kiedis was "much more subtle and much more cunning in his disguise."  During the tour in support of Freaky Styley, Slovak's health began to deteriorate. Slovak and Flea would wrestle regularly on tour, but Slovak became too weak to participate.  Kiedis commented on the situation: "I could tell that Hillel had no inner core of strength; he had been robbed by his addiction of the life force that allows you to at least defend yourself.  It was a sad moment."  A roadie of the band who was concerned for Slovak's health contacted his brother, James, who had been unaware that Slovak had ever used heroin.

Deciding to give sobriety a chance, both Kiedis and Slovak stopped using drugs prior to their European tour in support of The Uplift Mofo Party Plan, and decided to help each other "steer clear" of heroin. An entry from Slovak's diary on January 21, 1988, discusses his attempts to "begin a new drug-free phase of life". During the tour both experienced intense heroin withdrawal, with Slovak much more unstable than Kiedis. His withdrawal symptoms took a toll on his ability to play his instrument; at one point Slovak had a mental breakdown and was unable to play a show, leaving the rest of the band to play an entire set with no guitar.  He recovered a few days later, but was briefly kicked out of the band and replaced by DeWayne McKnight for a few shows.  After a few days with McKnight, the band decided to give Slovak another chance, and he rejoined for the European leg of the tour.  Kiedis attempted to take Slovak to drug addiction counseling, but Slovak had difficulty admitting that his addiction was serious enough to require medical help.

Death

Upon returning home, Slovak isolated himself from the rest of his bandmates, and struggled to resist drug abuse without the support of his friends, and Kiedis in particular. He stopped painting and writing in his diary during this time, and little is known about his life during the weeks following the tour, aside from a phone call to his brother on June 24, in which Slovak told him that he was having difficulty staying clean despite his desire to stop taking heroin.  A few weeks after the band returned from the tour, the members attempted to contact Slovak, but were unable to do so for several days.  Slovak died in his Hollywood apartment on June 25, 1988. On  June 27, 1988, his autopsy confirmed, authorities determined that he died due to a heroin overdose. He is interred at Mount Sinai Memorial Park Cemetery in Hollywood Hills, California.

Following his death Kiedis fled town and did not attend the funeral, considering the situation to be surreal. Although he found the death to be a shock, he was not initially "scared straight" and continued to use heroin.  However, a few weeks later his friend convinced him both to check into rehab and visit Slovak's grave, which inspired him to get clean. Irons was unable to cope with his death and subsequently left the band, saying that he did not want to be part of something that resulted in the death of his friends. Irons has suffered from severe depression since his death. This did not end Irons' musical career however, as he would work with Johannes on several projects including the band Eleven, and would join Pearl Jam for a period in the 1990s after initially declining to join the band upon its founding. Kiedis and Flea decided to continue making music, hoping to continue what he "helped build". They hired DeWayne McKnight and D.H. Peligro as replacements shortly, who were later replaced by Chad Smith and John Frusciante.

Musical style and legacy

Slovak was primarily influenced by hard rock artists such as Jimi Hendrix, Santana, and Led Zeppelin.  His playing method was markedly based on improvisation, a style commonly used in funk music.  He was also noted he would often play with such force that his fingers would "come apart."  Kiedis observed that his playing evolved during his time away from the group in What Is This?, with Slovak adopting a more fluid style featuring "sultry" elements as opposed to his original hard rock techniques.  On Uplift, Slovak experimented with genres outside of traditional funk music including reggae and speed metal.  His guitar riffs would often serve as the basis of the group's songs, with the other members writing their parts to complement his guitar work.  His melodic riff featured in the song "Behind the Sun" inspired the group to create "pretty" songs with an emphasis on melody.  Kiedis describes the song as "pure Hillel inspiration".  Slovak also used a talk box on songs such as "Green Heaven" and "Funky Crime", in which the sounds of his amplified guitar would be played through a tube into his mouth and then back into a microphone, creating psychedelic, voice-like effects.  Slovak helped to incorporate new sounds in the group's work, including adding occasional drum machines. Despite the fact that the group billed itself as "The Organic Anti-Beat Box Band", Kiedis states that Slovak showed the group that drum machines could be used as artistic instruments.

Slovak's work was one of the major contributing factors to Red Hot Chili Peppers' early sound. When Kiedis and Flea were searching for a new guitarist to replace Slovak, Kiedis likened the experience to "shopping for a new Mom and Dad" because of his influence over the band.  Flea, who originally listened exclusively to jazz, added that Slovak introduced him to a new genre of music, saying that "it was Hillel who first got me into hard rockin. He was also a huge influence on a young John Frusciante, who would later replace him as guitarist in the band. Frusciante based a lot of his playing style on Slovak's work, and explained, "I learned everything I needed to know about how to sound good with Flea by studying Hillel's playing and I just took it sideways from there."  Just like Slovak before him, Frusciante developed a heroin addiction. Unlike Slovak, Frusciante eventually managed to break and defeat the habit. The songs "Knock Me Down" (from Mother's Milk), "My Lovely Man" (from Blood Sugar Sex Magik), "This is the Place" (from By the Way), and "Feasting on the Flowers" (from The Getaway) were written about or as tributes to Slovak. The band's 1987 cover version of Jimi Hendrix's song "Fire", recorded with Slovak and previously only released on the "Fight Like a Brave" single and The Abbey Road EP, was included on 1989's Mother's Milk along with an image of one of Slovak's paintings inside the album's booklet. In 1999, a book titled Behind the Sun: The Diary and Art of Hillel Slovak was published. The book was authored by Slovak's brother, James Slovak, and features writings from his brother's diaries, paintings, photos and hand-written notes from Kiedis and Flea.

On December 7, 2011, Red Hot Chili Peppers were announced as 2012 inductees to the Rock and Roll Hall of Fame. Slovak's brother James accepted the award on his behalf and gave a speech honoring his brother. In an interview with Rolling Stone, Kiedis expressed his excitement with Slovak's induction, explaining "He's a beautiful person that picked up a guitar in the 1970s and didn't make it out of the 1980s, and he is getting honored for his beauty".  Flea echoed those comments on the same day: "Hillel grew up loving rock and roll so much, he hasn't been here for some time, but I know how much it would mean to him. It's a powerful thing."

Discography
With Addie Brik
Wattsland – EP – (1984)

With What Is This?
Squeezed – EP – (1984)
What Is This – (1985)
3 Out Of 5 Live – EP – (1985)

With Red Hot Chili Peppers
The Red Hot Chili Peppers – (1984)
Co-wrote "Get Up and Jump", "Green Heaven", "Out in L.A.", and "Police Helicopter"
Freaky Styley – (1985)
The Uplift Mofo Party Plan – (1987)
The Abbey Road E.P. – (1988)
Mother's Milk – (1989)
Performs on only one track, "Fire"
What Hits!? – (1992)
Out in L.A. – (1994)
Under the Covers: Essential Red Hot Chili Peppers – (1998)
The Best of Red Hot Chili Peppers – (1994)

References

Notes

Sources
 
 
 
 

1962 births
1988 deaths
20th-century American musicians
American funk guitarists
American male guitarists
American people of Croatian-Jewish descent
American people of Polish-Jewish descent
American rock guitarists
Israeli musicians
Israeli guitarists
Fairfax High School (Los Angeles) alumni
Israeli emigrants to the United States
Israeli people of Croatian-Jewish descent
Israeli people of Polish-Jewish descent
Jewish American musicians
Lead guitarists
Musicians from Haifa
Red Hot Chili Peppers members
Sitar players
What Is This? members
Deaths by heroin overdose in California
Burials at Mount Sinai Memorial Park Cemetery
Jews in punk rock
Jewish heavy metal musicians
20th-century American guitarists
20th-century American male musicians